Carson Steele (born October 21, 2002) is an American football running back who's playing for UCLA. He previously played for the Ball State Cardinals. A native of Indiana, he was selected as that state's "Mr. Football" in 2020. He  rushed for 891 yards as a college freshman in 2021 and ranks among the nation's leaders in 2022 with 1,376 rushing yards. He is known at Ball State by the nicknames "Thor", "Fabio", "Man of Steele", "Sunshine", and "God of College Ball."

Early years
Steele was raised in Greenwood, Indiana. He has had a pet alligator named "Crocky-J" since he was in first or second grade; the alligator grew to four or five feet in length. He attended Center Grove High School in Greenwood, rushing for 1,659 yards and 31 touchdowns as a senior in 2020.  He tallied a total of 5,907 rushing yards during his high school career. He was selected as Mr. Football in Indiana after the 2020 season.

College football
Steele signed a letter of intent to play college football at Ball State University in February 2021. Due to his long blonde  hair, fitness (less than 10% body fat), and talents as a running back, he received nicknames at Ball State, including "Thor", "Fabio", and "Man of Steele". As a freshman in 2021, he rushed for 891 yards and six touchdowns. During the freshman year, he squatted 615 pounds and was able to bench press 405 lbs. Barstool Sports' podcast "Unnecessary Roughness" called him "the most interesting man in CFB (college football)."

Prior to the 2022 season, Steele was selected by Bruce Feldman of The Athletic to his list of the top 100 "freaks" in college football. On November 8, 2022, he rushed for a career-high 198 yards and three touchdowns against Toledo. He also rushed for 192 yards against Kent State. He was awarded MAC West Offensive Player of the Week twice during the 2022 season. Through games played on November 19, 2022, Steele ranked ninth nationally with 1,376 rushing yards on 263 attempts (5.2 yards per carry).

On January 4, 2023, Steele committed to play for the UCLA Bruins football team.

References

External links
 Ball State profile

2002 births
Living people
American football running backs
Ball State Cardinals football players
People from Greenwood, Indiana
Players of American football from Indiana
Sportspeople from Indianapolis